Mar Vincent Azuero Diano (born 24 July 1997) is a Filipino professional footballer who plays for Philippines Football League (PFL) club Kaya F.C.–Iloilo and the Philippines national team.

College career
Diano attended the University of the East, playing for the UE Red Warriors football team in the University Athletic Association of the Philippines (UAAP). He played as a striker with the Red Warriors.

Club career

Mendiola 1991
Diano has played in the Philippines Football League. In 2019, he was part of Mendiola F.C. 1991.

Azkals Development Team
In 2020, he joined Azkals Development Team (ADT), a club whose roster is meant to comprise prospects for the Philippine national team.

In late 2020, Thai club Muangthong United reportedly wanted to sign in Diano after his 2020 season run with ADT. However the transfer has not materialized and Diano remained with ADT. Diano would help ADT finish as runners-up at the 2021 Copa Paulino Alcantara.

Kaya-Iloilo
In January 2022, Diano signed for Kaya-Iloilo.

International career

Philippines U19
Diano represented his country at the 2015 AFF U-19 Youth Championship

Philippines U22
He was also part of the U22 squad at the 2019 Southeast Asian Games, where he scored a goal against Timor-Leste.

Philippines
Diano had his first international cap for the Philippines national team during the 2022 FIFA World Cup qualifiers match against Maldives 15 June 2021. He came in as a substitute for Justin Baas in the match which ended in a 1–1 draw.

Career statistics

Club

Honors
Azkals Development Team
Copa Paulino Alcantara runner-up: 2021

Kaya–Iloilo
Copa Paulino Alcantara runner-up: 2022

References

University of the East alumni
University Athletic Association of the Philippines footballers
Philippines international footballers
Filipino footballers
Competitors at the 2019 Southeast Asian Games
Azkals Development Team players
Living people
Association football defenders
Southeast Asian Games competitors for the Philippines
1997 births